Philomena is a 2013 film directed by Stephen Frears, based on the 2009 book The Lost Child of Philomena Lee by journalist Martin Sixsmith. The film stars Judi Dench and Steve Coogan. It is based on the true story of Philomena Lee's 50-year search for her son and Sixsmith's efforts to help her find him.

The film gained critical praise and received several international film awards. Coogan and Jeff Pope won Best Screenplay at the 70th Venice International Film Festival, while the film was also awarded the People's Choice Award Runner-Up prize at the 2013 Toronto International Film Festival. The film was nominated for four Oscars at the 86th Academy Awards: Best Picture, Best Adapted Screenplay, Best Actress (for Dench), and Best Original Score. It was also nominated for four BAFTA Awards and three Golden Globe Awards.

Plot
London-based journalist Martin Sixsmith has lost his job as a government adviser. He is approached at a party by the daughter of Philomena Lee. She suggests that he write a story about her mother, who was forced to give up her toddler son Anthony nearly fifty years ago. Though Sixsmith is initially reluctant to write a human interest story, he meets Philomena and decides to investigate her case.

In 1951, Philomena became pregnant after having sex with a man she did not know at a county fair, and was sent by her father to Sean Ross Abbey in Roscrea in Ireland. After giving birth, she was forced to work in the convent laundry for four years, with little contact with her son. The nuns gave her son up for adoption without giving Philomena a chance to say goodbye. She kept her lost son a secret from her family for nearly fifty years.

Martin and Philomena begin their search at the convent. The nuns claim that the adoption records were destroyed in a fire years earlier; they did not, however, lose the contract she was forced to sign decades ago forbidding her from contacting her son, which Martin considers suspicious. At a pub, the locals tell Martin that the convent burnt the records deliberately, and that most of the children were sold for £1,000 each to wealthy Americans.

Martin's investigation reaches a dead end in Ireland, but he receives a promising lead from the United States and invites Philomena to accompany him there. His contacts help him discover that Anthony was renamed Michael A. Hess, who became a lawyer and senior official in the Reagan and George H. W. Bush administrations. When Philomena notices Martin in the background of a photo of Michael, he remembers that he met him years earlier while working in the US. They also learn that he has been dead for eight years.

Philomena decides she wants to meet people who knew Michael and learn more about him from them. They visit a former colleague of Michael's and discover that Michael was gay and died of AIDS. They also visit his sister Mary, who was adopted at the same time from the convent, and learn that they were both emotionally and physically abused by their adoptive parents, and hear about his partner Pete Olsson.

After avoiding Martin's attempts to contact him, Pete agrees to talk to Philomena. He shows Philomena some videos of his life with Michael. To Martin and Philomena's surprise, they see footage of Michael, dated shortly before he died, at the Abbey where he was adopted, and Pete explains that, although he never told his family, Michael had privately wondered about his birth mother all his life, and had returned to Ireland in his final months to try to find her. Pete informs them that the nuns had told Michael that his mother had abandoned him and that they had lost contact with her. He also reveals that, against his parents' wishes, he had Michael buried in the convent's cemetery.

Philomena and Martin go to the convent to ask them where Michael's grave is. Despite Philomena's pleas, Martin angrily breaks into the private quarters and argues with an elderly nun, Sister Hildegarde McNulty, who worked at the convent when Anthony was forcibly adopted. He accuses her of lying to Anthony and denying him the chance to finally reunite with Philomena, purely out of self-righteousness. Hildegarde is unrepentant, saying that losing her son was Philomena's penance for having sex out of wedlock.

Martin demands an apology, telling her that what she did was un-Christian, but is speechless when Philomena instead chooses to forgive her of her own volition. Philomena then asks to see her son's grave, where Martin tells her he has chosen not to publish the story. Philomena tells him to publish it anyway.

Cast

 Judi Dench as Philomena Lee
 Steve Coogan as Martin Sixsmith

 Michelle Fairley as Sally Mitchell
 Barbara Jefford as Sister Hildegarde
 Anna Maxwell Martin as Jane
 Mare Winningham as Mary

In addition to the main cast, Sophie Kennedy Clark plays a young Philomena, Kate Fleetwood plays a young Sister Hildegarde, Simone Lahbib plays Kate Sixsmith, Cathy Belton plays Sister Claire, Charlie Murphy plays Kathleen, Amy McAllister plays Sister Anunciata, Sean Mahon plays Michael, Philomena's son, and Peter Hermann plays Pete Olsson.

Soundtrack

The score of the film was composed by Alexandre Desplat, which was released on 25 October 2013 by Decca Records.

Reception

Box office
Philomena grossed $37.7 million in the United States and Canada, and $62.4 million in other territories, for a worldwide total of $100.1 million, against a production budget of $12 million.

In the film's second weekend of release, it grossed $4.5 million from 835 cinemas, finishing ninth.

Critical response
On Rotten Tomatoes, the film holds an approval rating of 90% based on 198 reviews, with an average rating of 7.74/10. The website's critical consensus reads: "Based on a powerful true story and led by note-perfect performances from Judi Dench and Steve Coogan, Philomena offers a profoundly affecting drama for adult filmgoers of all ages." At Metacritic, the film received a weighted average score of 77 out of 100, based on 42 critics, indicating "generally favorable reviews". Audiences polled by CinemaScore gave the film an average grade of "A" on an A+ to F scale.

In The New York Times, Stephen Holden described the film as "so quietly moving that it feels lit from within." He wrote: "That [Dench] makes you believe her character has the capacity to forgive provides the movie with a solid moral center." He found the film's political viewpoint particularly sophisticated:

Kelly Torrance of The Washington Times found that the film "ultimately feels false", with the filmmakers succumbing to the temptation to focus on the "lessons" the story holds at the expense of the human story itself. Justin Chang, of Variety, called the film a "smug but effective middlebrow crowdpleaser." While noting Dench's "fine, dignified performance", he observed that much of the humor here comes at the expense of Dench's character. "[I]t's hard not to wonder if the writers are simply scoring points off [Philomena]."

Rex Reed of The New York Observer gave the film a glowing review and named it the Best Film of 2013, saying: "It's profoundly moving and thoroughly mind provoking, but despite the poignant subject matter, I promise you will not leave Philomena depressed. I've seen it twice and felt exhilarated, informed, enriched, absorbed and optimistic both times. This is filmmaking at its most refined. I will probably forget most of what happened at the movies in 2013, but I will never forget Philomena."

The New York Posts film critic Kyle Smith judged the film "another hateful and boring attack on Catholics." He called it "90 minutes of organized hate" and wrote that: "A film that is half as harsh on Judaism or Islam, of course, wouldn't be made in the first place but would be universally reviled if it were." Philomena Lee responded to Smith with an open letter that said:

Producer Harvey Weinstein took out a full-page colour advertisement in The New York Times that quoted some favourable reviews and part of Smith's review accompanied by an excerpt from Lee's letter, and invited the public to make its own decision. Smith had accused several other films that were produced by Weinstein of anti-Catholicism, including The Magdalene Sisters (2002), The Butcher Boy (1998) and Priest (1995).

Awards

The film and its cast and crew have earned several award nominations, including four Academy Award nominations and four British Academy Film Award nominations. Dench and Coogan received nominations for Best Actress and Best Actor, respectively, at the British Independent Film Awards. Dench also garnered nominations for Best Actress from the Broadcast Film Critics Association, London Film Critics' Circle, Satellite Awards and Screen Actors Guild Awards. Philomena garnered three nominations at the 71st Golden Globe Awards, and also won the David di Donatello for Best European Film.

Historical authenticity
The film employs artistic licence with the real-life events. The visual blog Information is Beautiful deduced that, while taking creative licence into account, the film was 70.9% accurate when compared to real-life events due to "the (understandable) dramatic insertion of journalist Martin Sixsmith into the main plot line and big liberties with what Philomena actually knew and didn't know about her lost son". Philomena did not accompany Sixsmith to Washington to find her son, and her son's partner was keen to meet her and flew to the UK where they met in Sixsmith's house.

The film's principal antagonist, Sister Hildegard McNulty, existed in real life but the movie took broad artistic liberty to portray her in a negative light. The final scene in which McNulty chastises Philomena for carnality from her wheelchair is fictional. McNulty died in 1995, nine years before Sixsmith began his investigation into the Abbey; the two never met in real life. Sister Julie Rose, the order's assistant congregational leader, said: "We do feel that the film, even though it is not a documentary, does not tell the whole truth and in many ways is very misleading." An archival 1986 RTÉ interview of Sr Hildegarde depicts a woman weeping over many of the mothers who were in her care.

In a 2009 article for The Guardian, Sixsmith claims that in mid-twentieth-century Ireland, the Catholic church forced unwed mothers in their care to give up their children for adoption. Following pressure to do so, a Commission was formed by the Government of Ireland to investigate Mother and Baby Homes in 2015.

Sixsmith has said that Coogan's portrayal of him shared his "intolerance of injustice in all walks of life", and his admiration for a woman like Philomena who has the strength to rise above this. However, he is less angry than his on-screen version and is an agnostic rather than an atheist.

References

External links

 
 
 
 
 

2013 films
2013 comedy-drama films
2013 LGBT-related films
2010s English-language films
BAFTA winners (films)
BBC Film films
British comedy-drama films
British LGBT-related films
Drama films based on actual events
Films about adoption
Films based on non-fiction books
Films critical of the Catholic Church
Religious controversies in film
Christianity in popular culture controversies
Films directed by Stephen Frears
Films scored by Alexandre Desplat
Films set in Ireland
Films set in Washington, D.C.
Films set in England
Films set in the 1950s
Films set in the 2000s
Films whose writer won the Best Adapted Screenplay BAFTA Award
Films with atheism-related themes
LGBT-related drama films
LGBT-related films based on actual events
2010s British films